Łomża Governorate was an administrative unit (guberniya) of Congress Poland with seat in Łomża.

History
In 1867 territories of the Augustów Governorate and the Płock Governorate were divided into a smaller Płock Governorate, Suwałki Governorate (consisting mostly of the Augustów Governorate territories) and a recreated Łomża Governorate.

In 1893, a small amount of territory was transferred from the Łomża Governorate to the Warsaw Governorate.

Governors
1893–95 Reinhold Roman von Essen (1836–95)

Administrative divisions
It was divided into seven counties:

Language
By the Imperial census of 1897. In bold are languages spoken by more people than the state language.

References and notes

External links
 Gubernia Łomżyńska w Słowniku geograficznym Królestwa Polskiego i innych krajów słowiańskich, Tom V (Kutowa Wola – Malczyce) z 1884 r.
Geographical Dictionary of the Kingdom of Poland

 
Governorates of Congress Poland
Establishments in Congress Poland